Kacper Majchrzak (born 22 September 1992) is a Polish swimmer. He currently represents the Cali Condors which is part of the International Swimming League.
Majchrzak competed in the 50 m freestyle and 4 × 100m medley relay events at the 2012 Summer Olympics. He finished 10th in the 200 metre freestyle at the 2016 Summer Olympics setting a new national record of 1:46.30.

Career

International Swimming League
In 2019 he was a member of the inaugural International Swimming League representing the Cali Condors, who finished third place in the final match in Las Vegas, Nevada in December. Majchrzak competed in the 100 meter and 200 meter freestyle events as well as all 3 relay events throughout the season.

References

1992 births
Sportspeople from Poznań
Living people
Polish male freestyle swimmers
Swimmers at the 2012 Summer Olympics
Swimmers at the 2016 Summer Olympics
Olympic swimmers of Poland
Male medley swimmers
Universiade medalists in swimming
European Aquatics Championships medalists in swimming
Universiade silver medalists for Poland
Medalists at the 2017 Summer Universiade
Swimmers at the 2020 Summer Olympics
21st-century Polish people